Skarsbrotet Glacier is a cirque-type glacier draining the east slopes of Skarshaugane Peaks, in the Humboldt Mountains of Queen Maud Land. Discovered and photographed by the German Antarctic Expedition, 1938–39. Mapped by Norway from air photos and surveys by the Norwegian Antarctic Expedition, 1956–60, and named Skarsbrotet.

See also
 List of glaciers in the Antarctic
 Glaciology

References
 

Glaciers of Queen Maud Land
Humboldt Mountains (Antarctica)